The Battle of the Ancre Heights (1 October – 11 November 1916), is the name given to the continuation of British attacks after the Battle of Thiepval Ridge from  during the Battle of the Somme. The battle was conducted by the Reserve Army (renamed Fifth Army on 29 October) from Courcelette near the Albert–Bapaume road, west to Thiepval on Bazentin Ridge. British possession of the heights would deprive the German 1st Army of observation towards Albert to the south-west and give the British observation north over the Ancre valley to the German positions around Beaumont-Hamel, Serre and Beaucourt.

Many smaller attacks were made in the intervening periods, amid interruptions caused by frequent heavy rain, which turned the ground and roads into rivers of mud and grounded aircraft.

Stuff Redoubt fell on 9 October and the last German position in  Redoubt fell on 14 October, exposing the positions of the 28th Reserve Division in the Ancre valley to British ground observation. A German retreat from the salient that had formed around St. Pierre Divion and Beaumont Hamel either side of the Ancre, was considered by  Erich Ludendorff and the new army group commander Field Marshal Rupprecht, Crown Prince of Bavaria and rejected, due to the lack of better defensive positions further back, in favour of counter-attacks desired by General Fritz von Below the 1st Army commander. General Max von Gallwitz the 2nd Army commander, noted in early October that so many of his units had been moved to the 1st Army north of the Somme, that he had only one fresh regiment in reserve.

A French offensive during the Battle of Verdun on 24 October, forced the Germans to suspend the movement of troops to the Somme front. Fifth Army operations resumed in the Battle of the Ancre (13–18 November).

Background

Strategic developments
At the end of September, the Anglo-French armies had crossed the Péronne–Bapaume road around Bouchavesnes, taken Morval, Lesbœufs and Geuedecourt in the centre and captured most of Thiepval Ridge on the northern flank. On 29 September, Sir Douglas Haig instructed the Fourth Army to plan operations to advance towards Bapaume, reaching Le Transloy on the right and Loupart Wood north of the Albert–Bapaume road on the left. The Reserve Army was to extend the attacks of the Fourth Army by making converging attacks on the Ancre valley, attacking northwards from Thiepval Ridge towards Loupart Wood–Irles–Miraumont and eastwards on the north bank of the Ancre, by attacking towards Puisieux on a front from Beaumont Hamel to Hébuterne, with the right flank meeting the attacks from the south at Miraumont, to envelop German troops in the upper Ancre valley. The Third Army was to provide a flank guard north of the Reserve Army, by occupying a spur south of Gommecourt. The Reserve Army operations were to begin by 12 October, after the Fourth Army had attacked towards Le Transloy and Beaulencourt and the French Sixth Army had attacked Sailly-Saillisel around 7 October. The French Tenth Army south of the Somme was to attack on 10 October north of Chaulnes. Normal autumn weather in the Somme region would be an obstacle but an exceptional amount of rain and mist grounded aircraft and created vast mud fields, which caused many attacks to be postponed. Haig issued a much less ambitious directive on 7 October but the poor weather, German tactical changes and reinforcements on the Somme front, led to the costly failure of many attacks by both sides.

After meeting with Rawlinson and Gough, Haig cancelled the Third Army operation on 17 October. The Reserve Army plan for a converging attack towards the Ancre, was limited to an attack up the valley on 23 October. The failure of the Fourth Army attack of 18 October caused another revision of the plan, with II Corps of the Reserve Army to capture the rest of Thiepval Ridge on 19 October, the Fourth and French Sixth armies to attack on 23 October and the less ambitious Reserve Army attack to begin on 25 October. Gough issued a new operation order on 15 October and began another reorganization on the north side of the Ancre. There was more heavy rain on 19 October, which led a delay of the II Corps operation until 21 October. The attack succeeded but the rains returned on 24 October and the main attack next day was postponed. Gough was given discretion by Haig to make further postponements, on 27 October Gough set 1 November as the provisional date, postponed it again on 29 October to 5 November and on 3 November Haig gave Gough the choice of cancelling the attack; Haig also suggested a subsidiary attack while waiting for the weather to improve, if the state of the ground justified the effort. Gough proposed an attack on 9 November but preferred to wait for better weather. Haig agreed that no attack should begin until the ground was dry enough for infantry to move freely, when there was a forecast of two days of fair weather and another postponement followed.

In August the German armies on the Somme had been subjected to great strain. IX Reserve Corps had been "shattered" in the defence of Pozières, the 18th Reserve Division having lost . Ten fresh divisions had been brought into the Somme front and an extra division had been put into the line opposite the British. Movement behind the German front was made difficult by constant Anglo-French artillery-fire, which added to equipment shortages by delaying rail deliveries and interrupting road maintenance. Damage, wear, defective ammunition, capture and destruction had left   guns and   guns in the two German armies out of action by the end of August. The artillery situation was only slowly improved by the plan devised by Gallwitz to centralize counter-battery fire and use the reinforcements of aircraft to observe artillery fire. The extra aircraft had little effect on Allied air superiority but were able eventually to increase the accuracy and efficiency of bombardments.

The 2nd Army had been starved of reinforcements in mid-August to replace exhausted divisions in the 1st Army and plans for a counter-stroke had been abandoned for lack of troops. The emergency in Russia caused by the Brusilov Offensive, the entry of Rumania into the war and French counter-attacks at Verdun put further strain on the German army. Falkenhayn was sacked from the supreme command on 28 August and replaced by Hindenburg and Ludendorff. The new supreme command (Third OHL) ordered an end to attacks at Verdun and the despatch of troops from the area to Rumania and the Somme front. On 5 September, proposals for a new shorter line to be built in France were ordered from the commanders of the western armies, who met Hindenburg and Ludendorff at Cambrai on 8 September, where they announced that no reserves were available for offensive operations except those planned for Rumania. Ludendorff condemned the policy of holding ground regardless of its tactical value and advocated holding front-line positions with the minimum of troops and the recapture of lost positions by counter-attacks.

On 15 September, Rupprecht was ordered to prepare a rear defensive line and on 23 September work on the new  (Hindenburg Position) was ordered to begin. On 21 September, after the battle of Flers–Courcelette (15–22 September), Hindenburg ordered that the Somme front was to have priority in the west for troops and supplies and by the end of the Battle of Morval  Rupprecht had no reserves left on the Somme front. During September, the Germans had sent another thirteen fresh divisions to the British sector and scraped up troops wherever they could be found. On 7 October, Rupprecht forecast a British attack north of the Ancre River in mid-October. Anxieties about the situation at Verdun also increased and on 19 October, the despatch of reinforcements from Verdun to the Somme was suspended. Defeats inflicted by the French Tenth Army  led to the sacking of the 2nd Army Chief of Staff, Bronsart von Schellendorf.

Prelude

British offensive preparations

The front-line of the Reserve Army had not moved far since the beginning of the battle, except in the south, near the Albert–Bapaume road; the ground behind the front-line was far less damaged than that behind the Fourth Army. When supply routes to the Fourth Army were washed out by rain in October, movement remained relatively easy in much of the Reserve Army area. Gough began to concentrate more troops north of the Ancre, for the attack intended for 12 October. In early October the north bank had been held by the 39th Division of V Corps, up to the boundary with the Third Army at Hébuterne. On 1 October the 2nd Division was moved in on the left of the 39th Division, to hold the ground from Redan Ridge to the army boundary. On 4 October the XIII Corps headquarters was brought out of reserve, to control  of the front line, up to the junction with the Third Army and the left flank of the 2nd Division was relieved by the 51st Division. The 39th Division was transferred to the II Corps on 2 October and then took over the area immediately south of the Ancre on 5 October, by extending its right flank to relieve the 18th Division at Thiepval.

By 7 October, XIII Corps had the 51st and 19th Divisions in line and on 8 October, V Corps relieved the 2nd Division with the 3rd and 63rd divisions. The artillery of V Corps and XIII Corps steadily bombarded the German defences on the south bank, where II Corps operations against  (Regina Trench to the Canadians and Stuff Trench to the British) continued and simulated an offensive on the north bank with artillery bombardments, wire-cutting and smoke screens. Patrols and raids were carried out on the north bank, although mud and thick fog made it hard to keep direction. On 31 October, a patrol got into the German front-line near Hébuterne and found no Germans within . On the night of 2 November, two V Corps patrols reached the German second line near Serre and a raid by the 31st Division of XIII Corps on 7 November, took four prisoners.

The 1st Cavalry Division, twelve batteries of siege artillery and three divisional artilleries from the Third Army was transferred to the Reserve Army and all  in France were brought to Acheux. The constant postponements of the offensive gave tank commanders time to study the ground but the deterioration of the surface made tank operations unlikely. Tunnelling began in October between Beaumont-Hamel and Serre, to repair Russian saps (shallow trenches dug as tunnels, whose surfaces could be broken through, by crouching soldiers standing up) and to plant a mine at Hawthorn Ridge, under the crater made by the mine blown on 1 July. In the II Corps area south of the Ancre, the 25th Division had observation on its eastern flank over the Ancre valley around Grandcourt but the Germans had held on to the crest, from the northern face of Stuff Redoubt to the west end of the ridge. Preparations began for the capture of the rest of the redoubt and the higher ground just beyond, to gain observation over the rest of the Ancre valley. Assembly areas were prepared in Wood Post on the Authuille road and Blighty Valley and new communication trenches and deep dug-outs were built, before wet weather forced a postponement of the attack.

British plan of attack

Operations north of the Ancre waited on the completion of the capture of the ridge north of Courcelette and Thiepval, by the Canadian Corps and II Corps. The remainder of Stuff and  redoubts were to be captured and the front line was to be advanced to Regina Trench/Stuff Trench on the reverse slope of the ridge, the attack being set for 1 October. On 5 October Gough issued a Memorandum on Attacks which summarized the lessons of the battle. Gough pointed out that maintaining the momentum of an attack required succeeding waves and reserves not be kept waiting for opportunities to intervene in the battle, because communication delays left them with no time to act. Brigadiers should reorganize the troops holding successive objectives, since these troops became reserves once the advance had moved on.

Brigadiers should move with the advance and divisional commanders should create reserves by reorganizing their brigades. Headquarters should be placed where attacks could be seen, to keep in touch with events when communications broke down, a chronic problem which was increased by distance from the front line. Telephone links in the rear were far easier to maintain but became less important once the infantry battle began. Corps headquarters also had the benefit of air observation and less need of direct communication with troops on the battlefield, since their main role was counter-battery artillery-fire, which was independent of the infantry battle. The attack was to be maintained by the use of reserves moving towards objectives laid down before the attack, so as to make them independent of messages from the front line, which were often delayed and out of date if they arrived.

German defensive preparations
In the first fortnight of October, the six German divisions from Le Transloy to the Ancre were replaced by seven divisions, two of which were quickly relieved in turn. By 20 October, the changes ordered by the new supreme command had begun to take effect. On the Somme front,  heavy batteries arrived for the 1st Army and  the 2nd Army and  batteries were replaced. Systematic relief of tired divisions could be attempted, aircraft reinforcements were used to increase the amount of air observation for counter-battery fire, even more ammunition being fired in October than in September, which improved German infantry morale and slowed the advance of the Franco-British armies. Some of the changes were delayed in effect because of the French offensive at Verdun 24 October, which led to the suspension of transfers of troops to the Somme.

The relief of divisions opposite the British was achieved between 24 October and 10 November, by using more divisions from the 6th and 4th armies. After the British capture of Regina/Stuff Trench of 21 October, an evacuation of the salient from St Pierre Divion to Beaumont Hamel was proposed by Rupprecht but not implemented, because of objections by Below that the high ground still held gave valuable observation, which would be lost and that the remaining defences were strong and well-placed. The German troops north of the Ancre were reinforced, despite a suggestion from Loßberg the 1st Army Chief of Staff, to withdraw to the east of Lesbœufs. An attack was not expected east of Grandcourt on the south side of the river and the success of a 2nd Army counter-attack against the French Sixth Army at La Maisonnette on 29 October, increased German optimism that the battle of the Somme was almost over.

In late September, the Marine Infantry Brigade, which had an infantry strength equivalent to an army division and was composed of well trained and rested troops of excellent quality, was moved from the Belgian coast. In the long periods of poor visibility, artillery observation aircraft were grounded, which made British bombardments even more inaccurate but the Marine Brigade still had a stream of casualties caused by shellfire. Nightly supply deliveries and frequent relief enabled the Marines to hold their positions.

Battle

Reserve/Fifth Army

1–7 October
On 1 October the 2nd Canadian Division attacked Regina Trench with two brigades at  either side of the Courcelette–Miraumont road, despite many British shells falling short onto their jumping-off line. On the extreme right, the 4th Canadian Brigade dug in  forward and connected on the right with the 23rd Division north of Destremont Farm. Three 5th Canadian Brigade battalions attacked on a  front west of the road and the right hand battalion was caught by artillery and machine-gun fire, half way to Regina Trench. Hardly any troops reached the objective, where the wire was found to be uncut and the Canadian parties were forced to retreat. The centre battalion reached Kenora Trench but was not able to advance towards Regina Trench beyond, due to German machine-gun fire. The left battalion advanced at first, until the 3rd Canadian Division battalion of the 8th Canadian Brigade to its left was driven back by a German counter-attack, German bombers making their way down Regina Trench. By nightfall, the 5th Canadian Brigade held most of Kenora Trench, with outposts in the western of the two Courcelette–Miraumont roads and Courcelette Trench running north parallel to the eastern Courcelette–Miraumont road, before being relieved by the 6th Brigade before dawn.

On the left, a brigade of the 3rd Canadian Division was stopped by German artillery, uncut wire and machine-gun fire short of Regina Trench, where it conducted a bombing fight, before withdrawing at  a resumption of the attack was delayed by bad weather until 8 October. In the II Corps area west of the Canadian Corps, the 25th Division relieved the 11th Division on 1 October and began consolidation of the new front line in rain and mud, while waiting for an improvement in the weather to attack the rest of Stuff Redoubt. After fighting all day, the Germans gained a small amount of ground. At  next morning, a British battalion attempted to bomb their way into  Redoubt from two directions but bogged in deep mud. The 18th Division was relieved by the 39th Division on 7 October, which was then attacked in the British part of  Redoubt by German troops and a flame thrower detachment, which was repulsed by two battalions of 117th Brigade.

8 October
The 1st Brigade on the right with two battalions, took the front trench of the Le Sars line from Dyke Road to  beyond the Quadrilateral, then repulsed a counter-attack with artillery-fire. As the Canadians reorganized before resuming the attack on the Quadrilateral, a heavy German bombardment fell in the area and a counter-attack began from two directions. After night fell a trench was dug on the right to link with the 23rd Division. The right-hand battalion of the 3rd Brigade was delayed by uncut wire but forced its way through and took part of Regina Trench on its right flank. The left-hand battalion was stopped in front of the trench with many casualties and the brigade withdrew at nightfall. A few troops of the right-flank battalion of the 9th Brigade of the 3rd Canadian Division got into Regina Trench through some German sally ports but were overwhelmed. The left-hand battalion had reached Regina Trench, where it joined Courcelette Trench and been forced back by the defenders. Part of the 7th Brigade reached Regina Trench and began to bomb westwards and also worked its way up West Miraumont Road but was eventually forced back by German counter-attacks. The left hand battalion was obstructed by new German barbed wire covered by machine-guns and was not able to advance up Kenora Trench. Relief of the Canadian Corps began on 10 October.

9–20 October
In an operation by II Corps on 9 October, a battalion of the 39th Division attempted a surprise attack on the northern face of  Redoubt at  but the German defenders were ready for them. Only on the right flank, did British troops reached the trench but were then forced out by a German counter-attack. At  a battalion of the 25th Division attacked Stuff Redoubt, with the support of an "intense" barrage and by  captured the objective and pushed advanced posts forward to the north-east, although the high ground to the north could not be captured. Two counter-attacks in the evening were defeated by artillery and machine-gun fire. The 7th Brigade of the 25th Division began to prepare another attack on 10 October to take "The Mounds" not captured the day before. Next day, German counter-attacks were made at Stuff Redoubt against the 25th Division and continued on 12 October, including two supported by a flame-thrower detachment, which were repulsed. 13 October was quiet and on 14 October the 25th Division attacked "The Mounds", with the 7th Brigade.

Prisoners later said that the assembly for the attack had been seen but that the officer in command had ordered the German artillery to cease-fire just as the British attack began. Possession of The Mounds gave observation over Grandcourt and observation posts were pushed forward over the ridge. Work began on the extension of communication trenches soon after the attack, to be ready for another advance planned for 19 October. Next day the Germans counter-attacked the redoubt three times, two of the attacks using flame-throwers. On 16 October the 116th Brigade moved from the north bank of the Ancre and took over the redoubt, which was shelled all through 17 October. An attack by II Corps intended for 19 October was postponed because of heavy rain.

21 October
On 21 October a German attack at  occupied parts of  Redoubt, before being forced out by bombing attacks from two battalions of the 39th Division. The British attack delayed from 19 October began with the 4th Canadian Division on the right and the 18th, 25th and 39th divisions in line to the left, on a  front. The fire of  guns and howitzers and the field artilleries of seven divisions were found to have severely damaged Stuff/Regina Trench and cut most of the wire. East of the Courcelette–Pys road a defensive flank was formed, with outposts pushed forward from Regina Trench and the left-hand battalion linked with troops from the 18th Division. Three German counter-attacks were defeated during the afternoon. Two battalions from the 53rd Brigade of the 18th Division attacked and reached their objectives in Stuff Trench despite a delay at the Courcelette–Grandcourt road, where troops from the 25th Division joined in a bombing fight against a  unit. As the objective was being consolidated, twelve Germans arrived unaware that  had been occupied and were taken prisoner.

The 25th Division attacked with three battalions of the 74th Brigade on the right and with three battalions and an attached company of the 75th Brigade on the left. Standing artillery barrages were placed on all known German trenches, strongpoints and machine-gun nests and the creeping barrage was fired by three divisional artilleries. Some of the attackers advanced too far and the 75th Brigade on the left reached Stuff Trench with no troops on their right. The attack had taken thirty minutes and the advance was stopped by the British protective barrage. At Stump Road a short bombing fight took place to capture German dugouts along the road,   and three field guns being captured. Later in the day the 116th Brigade of the 39th Division attacked and captured Stuff Trench while troops from the 117th Brigade attacked Pope's Nose and gained some ground. Observation beyond the objective was found to be unsatisfactory because of the convex slope.

22 October – 11 November

During the night of 22 October, the 19th Division relieved the 25th Division and part of the 39th Division sector and the 18th Division moved its left boundary to the Pozières–Miraumont road. Prisoners were still being found and by the end of the day  been taken. Next day, a battalion of the 4th Canadian Division tried to advance along Regina Trench towards Farmer Road but they were stopped by flanking machine-gun fire and a German artillery bombardment. On 28 October the Special Brigade R. E. fired  "SK" (lacrymatory) 4-inch Stokes mortar bombs into Beaumont Hamel,   phosgene bombs into the village and Y Ravine nearby and thirty  White Star (50 percent chlorine: 50 percent phosgene) mortar bombs into Serre.

Vigorous raiding and patrolling began on the north bank of the Ancre. On 29 October the 39th Division took more ground at Pope's Nose, before bad weather stopped operations in II Corps on the south bank, until the night of 10/11 November. A patrol from troops of XIII Corps on the north bank entered the German front-line near Hébuterne on 31 October and found it empty and a raid by the 30th Division killed  on 7 November. At midnight two 10th Brigade battalions and a company from an 11th Brigade battalion of the 4th Canadian Division, attacked the east end of Regina Trench and established advanced posts to the north-east, close to the German positions of the Le Sars–Pys line, before defeating several counter-attacks. The Battle of the Ancre began on 13 November with more attacks by II Corps on the south bank, combined with attacks from V Corps and XIII Corps on the north bank.

Air operations

The deployment of two of the new  (fighter wings), challenged the air superiority of the Anglo-French air services. The troops who had spent periods on the Somme front earlier in the battle, were much encouraged by the sight of German aircraft challenging Allied aircraft, which continued during the infrequent periods of good flying weather in October. British reinforcements also reached the Somme front between August and October, three being new squadrons from England and five from the Royal Flying Corps (RFC) brigades further north, being replaced by four more new squadrons from England. The two squadrons of obsolete Royal Aircraft Factory B.E.12s were withdrawn from fighter operations and many squadrons on the Somme were tired and understrength.

Pressure was put on the Admiralty to send Royal Naval Air Service (RNAS) aircraft down from Dunkirk and Naval Squadron No. 8 (Naval 8) arrived at Vert Galand on 26 October. In the morning of 1 October two III Brigade squadrons attacked the railway station at Miraumont with  bombs, which caused fires to burn all afternoon and aircraft from 19 Squadron attacked German billets at Havrincourt. During the Canadian attack that afternoon, British artillery observation aircraft sent  calls to the artillery to fire on German artillery batteries and  sent by balloon observers. Rain fell all next day, grounding British aircraft; a formation of German aircraft surprised the British by appearing over the front-line, where one was shot down by anti-aircraft fire. Very little air activity took place until 10 October when the rain abated. Aircraft from both sides flew many sorties and several British aircraft were shot down, all by Jasta 2 (Boelcke). An offensive patrol attacked seven German aircraft over Vélu and drove them off, despite the superior speed and manoeuvrability of the German aircraft, one aircraft from each side being shot down, along with three more from each side lost near Morval and Pozierès. British aircraft attacked Douai aerodrome and the railway stations at Cambrai, Marcoing and Vitry overnight.

More bad weather restricted flying until 16 October, when British and German bombers began operations before dawn. Cambrai was bombed again and the Germans attacked the aerodrome of 9 Squadron, wounding two ground crew, destroying one aircraft and damaging another. In the afternoon the British attacked Havrincourt, the station and aerodrome at Hermies and then Ruyaulcourt, two British aircraft being shot down. British corps aircraft were frequently attacked by German fighters, one being shot down and another damaged and four German and one British aircraft were shot down, in fights with British offensive patrols. The better weather continued on 17 October and a supply dump was blown up at Bapaume station. A reconnaissance by Third Army aircraft at the north end of the Somme front, met twenty German fighters and two aircraft were shot down by each side. A British aircraft was driven down by German fighters and two German aircraft were forced down by 24 Squadron near Vélu; rain and sleet then stopped flying for two days.

Nine aircraft of 27 Squadron made a long-range attack on Aulnoye junction near Maubeuge, for no loss and 70 Squadron aircraft which photographed Valenciennes and Le Quesnoy returned. Thirty-three German aircraft crossed the British front line and made many attacks on British aircraft; three German aircraft were shot down and seventeen claimed damaged. German night bombers attacked Querrieu, Corbie and Longueau, where an ammunition waggon was blown up; British aircraft attacked Vélu and Péronne. Zone calls from British aircraft silenced many German guns, including nine German batteries firing on the Canadian troops attacking Regina Trench. Long-range bombers attacked an ammunition dump at Ath (near Mons) which had been reported by a French spy. Quéant station was bombed by thirty more aircraft and escorts, which were intercepted over the target and one bomber shot down. An escort pilot flying a Nieuport 17 turned back, after the bombers reached British lines but was then forced down in a dogfight with a faster German aircraft. On other parts of the Somme front two German aircraft were shot down, three damaged and ten driven down.

On 22 October there were many sorties by German flyers. Six aircraft attacked a Sopwith 1½ Strutter of 45 Squadron and wounded the observer, who shot one down. Later in the day, three 45 Squadron aircraft were shot down and an F.E.2b shot down one aircraft and damaged another, before the observer was mortally wounded; four British aircraft were shot down beyond German lines. On 26 October, despite poor weather both sides flew many sorties; a fight between five Airco DH.2's of 24 Squadron and twenty Halberstadt D.II's was indecisive but later in the day a formation of eight aircraft led by Boelcke, shot down one British observation aircraft, forced down two more and a British fighter which intervened. One German fighter was then shot down when a formation of British fighters from 32 Squadron turned up. Boelcke was killed on 28 October, when he collided with a German aircraft during an attack on two British fighters, which returned safely. For the rest of the battle of the Somme, both sides flew in rain, mist, sleet and westerly gales, often at dangerously low heights, to direct artillery and attack troops with guns and bombs.

3 November was a clear day and German aircraft shot down five British aircraft. On the night of 6 November German night bombers hit an ammunition train near Cerisy, which exploded next to a cage for German prisoners of war and devastated the area. Better weather came on 8 November and many German aircraft made ground attacks on British troops, a tactic which the  began to incorporate systematically into its defensive operations. The British attempted to divert German attention next day, with bombing raids on Arleux and Vraucourt. The raid on Vraucourt by twelve bombers and fourteen escorts became the biggest air fight of the war, when approximately thirty German aircraft attacked the formation as it crossed the front lines. Most of the bombs were dropped over the target but six British aircraft were shot down and three German aircraft were claimed. Three more British aircraft were shot down later in the day; one pilot was killed, one wounded and an observer were wounded in aircraft which returned. The railway station at Vitry and German airfields at Buissy, Vélu and Villers were attacked after dark, while German night bombers attacked the airfield at Lavieville.

The British attacked Valenciennes aerodrome next morning, where five parked aircraft, hangars and sheds were bombed. Next day, German air operations were less extensive; three aircraft were shot down and three damaged for the loss of one British aeroplane. Naval 8 drove down two German aircraft on 10 November and overnight 18 Squadron retaliated for the attack on their airfield at Lavieville by bombing Valenciennes, Vélu, transport on the Bapaume road, balloon sheds, a train near St. Léger and a second train which was set on fire; a German headquarters at Havrincourt Château and Douai aerodrome were also attacked. German bombers attacked Amiens station and returned on the night of 10/11 November, when one aircraft was forced down with engine-trouble and the crew captured. On 11 November, operations began for the Battle of the Ancre, the last British attack of the Battle of the Somme, before the offensive was stopped for the winter.

German 1st Army
On 1 October, the British artillery bombardment increased in intensity to "drumfire", while the German artillery stayed silent because of a shortage of ammunition, being limited to firing only when the British infantry attack began. British aircraft flew overhead at  observing for the artillery, strafing the ground when they saw movement and throwing hand-grenades. At about  the British artillery lifted towards  and Miraumont. The German defenders of the 8th Division saw waves of Canadian infantry advancing, while the division was being relieved by the Marine Brigade and fired rockets to alert the German artillery, which opened fire immediately. Numerous counter-attacks by battalions of the 1st and 2nd Marine Regiments eventually forced the Canadians to withdraw, before attempting to attack again by dribbling forward from shell-hole to shell-hole. The Canadian attacks ceased at nightfall, having been costly to both sides. On 7 October the 110th Reserve Regiment of the 28th Reserve Division, which was relieving the 26th Reserve Division, began attacks on  assisted by  detachments, which continued on 8 October.

A hasty counter-attack collapsed into chaos on the night of 14/15 October, despite the participation of stormtrooper and  detachments. A company refused to attack for fear of being hit by German artillery and when a second attack was ordered another company refused to attack. By 22 October, the British had captured  from the 28th Reserve and 5th  divisions, which were relieved in turn by the 38th Division and the 58th Division, which counter-attacked  and the lines to the east on 26 October. The attack failed with many casualties in the 107th Regiment of the 58th Division and the 2nd Guard Reserve Regiment of the 1st Guard Reserve Division further east. Divisions which had already fought on the Somme and were being sent for a second time, found that their fighting power had been seriously eroded.

French operations

The French Sixth Army operations to outflank Péronne from the north continued in October and the British Fourth Army co-operated with the Sixth Army in the Battle of Le Transloy  Waterlogged ground of the Somme valley obstructed progress further south but XXXIII Corps which operated on both sides of the Somme, attacked on the south bank on 18 October, to counter German mining and improve the line from La Maisonnette to Biaches, although a German counter-attack on 21 October regained some ground. On 29 October, the XXXIII Corps was pushed out of La Maisonnette, at the end of the salient south-east of Biaches. A French attempt to retake the village was delayed and eventually cancelled. More attacks by the Tenth Army were delayed by bad weather until 7 November, when Bois Kratz, Pressoire and Ablaincourt were captured; numerous German counter-attacks, including a big attack at Bois Kratz and Pressoir on 15 November were defeated and preparations were begun by the French to advance to a line from Mazancourt, to Happlincourt and Biaches, ready for a spring offensive.

Aftermath

Analysis

Rather than order a withdrawal from these exposed positions, Rupprecht and Ludendorff accepted Below's argument that there were no better positions to withdraw to and supported his attempt to recapture the redoubts, which only added to German losses. Reports made after the battle by units of the Canadian Corps, stressed that battalion command was impossible once an attack began, companies and platoons needed to be given objectives before the attack and discretion on how to reach them. (Some units pointed out that most of the tools carried by the leading troops were thrown away anyway.) The importance of carrying enough hand grenades was stressed, since uncut wire forced the attackers into German communication trenches, where many more were used to fight forward, which used up the stock intended for repelling counter-attacks, compared to an advance on the surface.

Where barbed wire was cut, the infantry could move above ground, bypassing isolated German defences and leaving them for mopping-up parties. The value of Lewis guns and plenty of ammunition was emphasised in many reports, as was the importance of moving them forward quickly in an attack, to support the infantry and then be ready to engage German infantry counter-attacks. By the end of the battle of the Somme, each platoon had a Lewis gun, giving  battalion. The mortar was most useful in static positions at the rear, until supply routes had been built to the new front line. Tanks were judged to have serious limitations in mechanical reliability, mobility and armour protection but were considered a useful accessory to infantry operations, having overcome German strong points and diverted German artillery-fire from the infantry. It was found that tank-infantry co-ordination had been impossible, since tanks and infantry moved at different speeds but that when infantry led an attack, tanks could mop-up behind them and when tanks led, they could destroy German defences before the infantry arrived.

Tactics were considered and a new platoon organization was proposed by Major-General R. B. Stephens of the 5th Division, in which there would be four specialist sections, equipped with rifles, rifle-grenades, bombs and a Lewis gun. Advancing by flanking manoeuvres was favoured, to exploit the German defensive change from trench lines to strongpoints, after they had been forced out of their front-line defences on the Somme. Infantry could follow a creeping barrage to within  of German defences, crawl another  and then rush the Germans, before they could emerge from their shelters. It was recommended that infantry waves be equipped for different tasks, with the first wave comprising about half of the attacking force, carrying rifles, bombs and Lewis guns, the Lewis gunners and bombers moving beyond the objective to form advanced posts and the second wave carrying tools and trench stores for consolidation. Opinion about the allocation of objectives varied, with some reports favouring the first wave moving on from the first objective and others advocating that following waves leap-frog through the wave ahead, while that wave consolidated and recovered from the stress and exertion of the advance.

Details of infantry formation within lines and waves (groups of lines) was discussed, with dispersal advocated to present smaller targets to German machine-gunners and artillery and concentration emphasised, to keep troops close enough together to be able to overwhelm German defences. If infantry waves passed beyond initial objectives, the ground would need to be searched and garrisoned, to prevent German troops firing on them from behind. It was recommended that mopping-up parties should form  the attacking force and be ready to act as local reinforcements, should the attack bog down. Some units wanted a third wave of attackers, who could prepare captured ground for defence without delay.

Regaining contact with field artillery after the attack was considered essential, so that German counter-attacks could be engaged with shrapnel fire, to obstruct German troops as they concentrated for attack and to create a barrier against the survivors. Advanced posts pushed beyond the objective gave early warning of German attacks and forced then under cover, outside grenade-throwing range; the advanced posts could also be connected later. Communication was essential, all reports stressed the efficiency of telephones and some units advocated dispensing with visual communication, since the smoke and dust of battle made them invisible. Runners were the second most reliable means of maintaining contact between advanced troops, battalion and brigade headquarters. The Canadian Corps decided to use telephones, runners, pigeons and visual signals, given the unpredictable characteristics of the battlefield. Aeroplanes on contact-patrol had been found to be ineffective and more training of the infantry in contact-patrol liaison was recommended.

Casualties

The 2nd Canadian Division suffered   casualties  October. Casualties suffered by the 3rd Canadian Division  October were  The 18th Division incurred  casualties  October. The Marine Brigade suffered  in one regiment and up to 41 per cent of the other two until it was relieved by the 5th Ersatz Division on the night of 11/12 October.

Victoria Cross
James Richardson of the 16th Battalion (Canadian Scottish), 3rd Brigade, 1st Canadian Division was awarded a posthumous Victoria Cross for his actions on 8 October 1916.

See also

 List of Canadian battles during World War I

Notes

Footnotes

References

Further reading
 
  Translation of Meine Tätigkeit im Weltkriege 1914–1918 (Berlin, Verlag Ernst Siegfried Mittler und Sohn 1939)

External links

 Commonwealth War Graves Commission
 Courcelette Memorial

Battle of the Somme
Battle honours of the Rifle Brigade
Battles of the Western Front (World War I)
Battles of World War I involving Canada
Battles of World War I involving Germany
Conflicts in 1916
Battle honours of the King's Royal Rifle Corps
October 1916 events
November 1916 events